San Remo is an inner northern coastal suburb of Mandurah.

The suburb, along with neighbouring Silver Sands, were gazetted in 1989. Both suburbs were named after developer estates, which entered in popular local usage.

References

Suburbs of Mandurah